Antonella Kerr, Marchioness of Lothian  (born Antonella Reuss Newland; 8 September 1922 – 6 January 2007), also known as Tony Lothian, was an Italian-born British aristocrat, journalist and writer.

Lady Lothian was the founding president of the annual Women of the Year Lunches at the Savoy Hotel in 1955, and the mother of Conservative parliamentarian and Shadow Cabinet minister Michael Ancram (now Marquess of Lothian).

Life
Antonella Reuss Newland was born in Rome, the only child of Major-General Sir Foster Reuss Newland KCMG CB (1862–1943) and his wife, Donna Nennella Salazar y Munatones.

Her parents married in 1918, but divorced in 1928 after her mother, the daughter of an Italian army lieutenant-general, Conte Michele Salazar (descendant of a Spanish nobleman from the times of the Spanish presence in Italy), left her 66-year-old father for a 27-year-old army officer, later Brigadier William Carr CVO DSO.

Newland married a distant relative, Peter Kerr, 12th Marquess of Lothian, at the Brompton Oratory on 30 April 1943; he was then serving as a lieutenant in the Scots Guards. The couple spent most of their married life at Monteviot House and its surrounding  estate near Jedburgh in the Scottish Borders. The Kerrs also owned Melbourne Hall in Derbyshire but they later retired to Ferniehirst Castle in Roxburghshire after dividing the other estates between their sons.

The couple had two sons and four daughters. Her husband died on 11 October 2004, being succeeded by their elder son, Conservative politician Michael, Earl of Ancram. The younger son is Lord Ralph Kerr. Their eldest daughter, Lady Mary Kerr, was a folksinger and won a silver medal in skiing at the 1969 British Commonwealth Games, and later married Charles von Westenholz. Their second daughter, Lady Cecil Kerr, married Donald Cameron of Lochiel, the XXVII and present Chief of Clan Cameron. The other daughters married the heirs of the Duke of Grafton and the Duke of Buccleuch and Queensberry: Clare Kerr married James FitzRoy, Earl of Euston, and Elizabeth Kerr married Richard Scott, Earl of Dalkeith, the 10th and present Duke of Buccleuch and Queensberry.

Lady Lothian pursued her own independent career as an author, broadcaster and journalist. She was a columnist with the Scottish Daily Express from 1960 to 1975. She was elected a fellow of the Institute of Journalists and won the Templeton Award in 1992.

With Odette Hallowes and Lady Georgina Coleridge she founded the annual Women of the Year Lunches at the Savoy Hotel in 1955, in aid of the Greater London Fund for the Blind and other charities. She was vice-president of the Royal College of Nursing from 1960 to 1980 as well as being a patron of the National Council of Women of Great Britain and the Royal College of Obstetricians and Gynaecologists.

Lady Lothian lost an eye in 1970 as a result of cancer, afterwards using a black eye patch. She was appointed an OBE in 1997 "for services to women and blind people" and a Dame of the Order of St Gregory the Great in 2002.

Lady Lothian interviewed the Soviet cosmonaut Valentina Tereshkova for her book ''Valentina: First Woman in Space.

Bibliography
Fight for the Light: What Should Christians Do So that New Shapes in Suffering Can be Overcome? (Church of Scotland, 1973)
Valentina: First Woman in Space : Conversations with A. Lothian (Pentland Press, 1993) ISBN 9781858210643

Honours 
  - OBE
  - DSG

See also 
 Marquess of Lothian
 List of family seats of Scottish nobility

References

External links
Tony Lothian Prize
Obituary, The Times, 8 January 2007
Obituary, The Daily Telegraph, 8 January 2007

1922 births
2007 deaths
British philanthropists
British Roman Catholics
British people with disabilities
Royalty and nobility with disabilities
20th-century British women writers
21st-century British women writers
Dames of St. Gregory the Great
Officers of the Order of the British Empire
Italian emigrants to the United Kingdom
British people of Spanish descent
Lothian
20th-century Scottish women
21st-century Scottish women
National Council of Women of Great Britain members
20th-century British journalists
Scottish non-fiction writers
Scottish people of Italian descent
Scottish people of Spanish descent